Admetula bayeri, common name: Bayer's nutmeg, is a species of sea snail; a marine gastropod mollusk in the family Cancellariidae, also referred to as the nutmeg snails.

Description

Distribution
This species is found in the Caribbean Sea and along Mexico.

References

 Petit, R.E. & Harasewych, M.G. (2005) Catalogue of the superfamily Cancellarioidea Forbes and Hanley, 1851 (Gastropoda: Prosobranchia)- 2nd edition. Zootaxa, 1102, 3–161. NIZT 682

External links

Cancellariidae
Gastropods described in 1976